The End of Days is the eleventh album by steampunk band Abney Park, and their third steampunk-themed album.  The album was released on October 15, 2010.

Digital release
The album was released for download on November 2, 2010, three weeks after the release of the physical album.

Track listing
"The End of Days" - 3:24
"Neobedouin" - 3:41
"The Wrath of Fate" - 3:05
"I've Been Wrong Before" - 2:54
"Inside the Cage" - 0:21
"Fight or Flight" - 3:15
"Victorian Vigilante" - 4:12
"Chronograph" - 0:32
"Letters Between a Little Boy and Himself as an Adult" - 3:47
"Beautiful Decline" - 4:04
"Off the Grid" - 2:36
"To The Apocalypse in Daddy's Sidecar" - 4:02
"Space Cowboy" - 3:11

Personnel

Regular band members 
 "Captain" Robert Brown - songs, singing, bouzouki, harmonica, accordion, darbuka
 Kristina Erickson - keyboards, piano
 Nathaniel Johnstone - violin, guitar, banjo, mandolin
 Daniel Cederman - bass
 Jody Ellen - voice

Guest artists 
 Richard Lopez - trombone, alto flute
 Carey Rayburn - vintage muted trumpet
 Erica "Unwoman" Mulkey - cello

References

2010 albums
Abney Park (band) albums